Azrudin Valentić (born 21 July 1970), known as Vali is a Bosnian professional football manager and former player.

Club career
Valentić started out his playing career in Bosnian club FK Sarajevo where he won the league. He then went on to play for Raith Rovers in Scotland and SK Vorwärts Steyr in Austria before his career ended because of injury.

Managerial career
Valentić moved to Sweden in 2002 and four years later started working for Vasalunds IF as an individual coach before becoming their manager in 2009. In 2011, he took over as manager for Assyriska FF.

Fremad Amager
Valentić was appointed manager of Fremad Amager at the end of October 2018.

On 1 July 2019, Fremad Amager announced, that Olof Mellberg had joined the club as their new manager. Vali was reinforced with Mellberg, who he worked with in IF Brommapojkarna. With the access of Mellberg, the club changed the structure of the sporting staff, with Mellberg becoming manager and Vali becoming the first team coach. However, only two months after Mellberg's arrival, he left the club in the favor of Helsingborg IF and Valentić was re-appointed as the manager of the club. He guided the club to a 4th place in the 2019–20 Danish 1st Division.

Botev Plovdiv
In January 2021 Valentić was signed by Bulgarian side Botev Plovdiv.

Managerial statistics

References

External links

Fotbolltransfers Profile

1970 births
Living people
Footballers from Sarajevo
Association football forwards
Yugoslav footballers
Bosnia and Herzegovina footballers
FK Sarajevo players
Raith Rovers F.C. players
SK Vorwärts Steyr players
NK Olimpija Ljubljana (1945–2005) players
Scottish Football League players
Austrian Football Bundesliga players
Slovenian PrvaLiga players
Premier League of Bosnia and Herzegovina players
Bosnia and Herzegovina expatriate footballers
Expatriate footballers in Scotland
Bosnia and Herzegovina expatriate sportspeople in Scotland
Expatriate footballers in Austria
Bosnia and Herzegovina expatriate sportspeople in Austria
Expatriate footballers in Slovenia
Bosnia and Herzegovina expatriate sportspeople in Slovenia
Bosnia and Herzegovina football managers
Swedish football managers
Vasalunds IF managers
Assyriska FF managers
Dalkurd FF managers
Fremad Amager managers
Botev Plovdiv managers
Bosnia and Herzegovina expatriate football managers
Expatriate football managers in Sweden
Bosnia and Herzegovina expatriate sportspeople in Sweden
Expatriate football managers in Denmark
Bosnia and Herzegovina expatriate sportspeople in Denmark
Expatriate football managers in Bulgaria
Bosnia and Herzegovina expatriate sportspeople in Bulgaria
Danish 1st Division managers